Walter was a Benedictine hermit. He later became abbot, being the founder of the monastery of Serviliano in the Marches of Ancona, Italy. This monastery was famed for the rejuvenation pioneered by religious orders in that era.

Notes

Italian Roman Catholic saints
13th-century Christian saints
1250 deaths
Benedictine monks
Year of birth unknown
Benedictine abbots